The Central District of Charuymaq County is in East Azerbaijan province, Iran. At the National Census in 2006, its population was 21,136 in 4,194 households. The following census in 2011 counted 20,341 people in 5,359 households. At the latest census in 2016, the district had 19,704 inhabitants in 5,802 households.

References 

Charuymaq County

Districts of East Azerbaijan Province

Populated places in East Azerbaijan Province

Populated places in Charuymaq County